Eudonia angustea is a moth of the family Crambidae described by John Curtis in 1827. It is found in southern and western Europe, the Canary Islands, Madeira and Turkey.

The wingspan is 17–22 mm.The forewings are narrow, whitish, mixed with brownish and sprinkled with black; base darker; lines whitish, dark-edged, first oblique,second sinuate ; orbicular outlined with black ; claviform black, touching first line; a black X-shaped discal mark,upper half filled with light brownish ; subterminal line cloudy,whitish, hardly touching second. Hindwings are whitish-grey,terminally obscurely darker.The larva is blackish-grey, slightly greenish-tinged; spots darker or almost black ; head pale brown ; plate of 2 dark brown or almost black.

Adults are on wing from July to late autumn.

The larvae feed on mosses on walls and in sand dunes.

References

Moths described in 1827
Eudonia
Insects of the Canary Islands
Moths of Europe
Moths of Asia
Moths of Africa